William Upton may refer to:
 William W. Upton, American jurist and politician
 William Upton (cricketer), English cricketer
 Bill Upton, Major League Baseball pitcher